Paradiphascon is a monotypic genus of tardigrades belonging to the family Hypsibiidae. The only species is Paradiphascon manningi.

The species is found in South African Republic.

References

Parachaela
Tardigrade genera
Monotypic animal genera